The 1966 Clemson Tigers football team was an American football team that represented Clemson University in the Atlantic Coast Conference (ACC) during the 1966 NCAA University Division football season. In its 27th season under head coach Frank Howard, the team compiled a 6–4 record (6–1 against conference opponents), won the ACC championship, and was outscored by a total of 177 to 174. The team played its home games at Memorial Stadium in Clemson, South Carolina.

Mike Facciolo was the team captain. The team's statistical leaders included Jimmy Addison with 1,491 passing yards, Buddy Gore with 750 rushing yards, Phil Rogers with 574 receiving yards, and Jacky Jackson with 48 points scored.

Five Clemson players were selected by the Associated Press as first-team players on the 1966 All-Atlantic Coast Conference football team: back Jimmy Addison; offensive tackle Wayne Mass; offensive guard Harry Olszewski; defensive end Butch Sursavage; and defensive back Wayne Page.

Schedule

References

Clemson
Clemson Tigers football seasons
Atlantic Coast Conference football champion seasons
Clemson Tigers football